Duality of Man (2016) is an album by Greek thrash metal band Memorain.  It was released on 16 January 2016 by Rock of Angels Records.

Track listing

All music and lyrics composed by Ilias Papadakis, except where noted.

Personnel

Musicians
 Vagelis Kolios    – vocals
 Ilias Papadakis     – guitars  
 Jason Mercury     – guitars
 Aris Nikoleris    – bass
 Sevan Barsam    – drums

Guests
 Blaze Bayley – vocals on track 4
 David Ellefson – bass on track 4
 Michael Gilbert – main solo on track 9
 Steve Conley – main solo on track 11

Production

Ilias Papadakis – Producer
Vagelis Ziakas – Recording & Mastering 
Randy Walker - Recording (David Ellefson's bass), Engineering (David Ellefson's bass) 
Maria Sakantanis – Illustrations, design
Caio Caldas - Artwork
Christos Magnisalis – Photography

References

2016 albums
Memorain albums